Russell George Tovey (born 14 November 1981) is an English actor. He is best known for playing the role of werewolf George Sands in the BBC's supernatural comedy-drama Being Human, Rudge in both the stage and film versions of The History Boys, Steve in the BBC Three sitcom Him & Her, Kevin Matheson in the HBO original series Looking and its subsequent series finale television film Looking: The Movie, and Patrick Read in American Horror Story: NYC.

Early life
Tovey was born on 14 November 1981 in Billericay, Essex. He is the younger of two sons of Carole (née Webb) and George Tovey, who ran a Romford-based coach service taking passengers from Essex to Gatwick Airport. Tovey has an older brother, Daniel. He attended Harold Court School in Harold Wood and Shenfield High School.

Tovey noted that as a boy he "was an avid collector of various things and prone to participating in fads." His parents supported his efforts, taking him to archaeological digs and museums, buying him a metal detector and going to conventions for mineralogists. For a time he wanted to be a history teacher, but after seeing Dead Poets Society, The Goonies, and Stand By Me he decided to be an actor. For a time during his teens he worked as a kitchen assistant in Billericay's King's Head pub.

Career

Acting
Tovey began his career as a child actor. He joined a local drama club and garnered the attention of a talent agent. He worked from the age of 11 and missed so much school that his father suggested he should cut back, but his mother persuaded his father to let their son continue. His TV career started in 1994, when he was cast in Mud, a children's series broadcast on CBBC.

He left secondary school at the age of 16 and started a BTEC in performing arts at Barking College. He was expelled after a year for refusing a role in the school play in favour of a paying acting job. He acted in plays in Chichester under the direction of Debra Gillett, wife of Patrick Marber. He met Marber through Gillett, and Marber cast him in the play Howard Katz at the National Theatre. He also performed in His Girl Friday and His Dark Materials there.

In 2004, he took the role of Rudge in Alan Bennett's play The History Boys at the Royal National Theatre as well as touring to Broadway, Sydney, Wellington and Hong Kong and playing the role in the radio and film adaptations. He originally auditioned for the role of Crowther but agreed to act the part of Rudge after Bennett promised to beef up the role. Insecure because he had not attended drama school as many of his peers had, he enrolled in numerous workshops and readings offered by the National Theatre.

In spring 2007, Tovey had a recurring role in BBC Three comedy Rob Brydon's Annually Retentive, playing Rob's producer, Ben. He played Midshipman Alonso Frame, in 2007 Doctor Who Christmas Special "Voyage of the Damned". Russell T. Davies, the show's executive producer and lead writer, had suggested Tovey as a future replacement for David Tennant, before it was announced that the Eleventh Doctor would be played by Matt Smith. Tovey reprised his role as Midshipman Alonso Frame in the 2009-10 Doctor Who Christmas special, "The End of Time".

Tovey played werewolf George Sands, one of three supernatural housemates in the drama Being Human. The pilot premiered on BBC Three on 18 February 2008. A six-part series was commissioned with the first episode broadcast on 25 January 2009. Tovey left the regular cast of the show at the start of the fourth season on 5 February 2012. In November 2012 AudioGO Ltd released an audiobook version of Mark Michalowski's Being Human tie-in novel Chasers, which is narrated by Tovey.

In a 2008 interview in Attitude, Tovey expressed his desire to play darker roles: "really dark, fucked-up characters... like drag queens, rent boys, someone who has been abused, a rapist", though noting that he does not consider himself "fucked-up".

In March 2009, the actor played a leading role in A Miracle at the Royal Court Theatre as Gary Trudgill, a British soldier returning to Norfolk from abroad. On 8 March 2009 he presented the Award for Best Actress to Margaret Tyzack for her performance in The Chalk Garden at the Laurence Olivier Awards in Grosvenor House.

In 2009, Tovey worked on the film Huge and starred in two television pilots: Young, Unemployed and Lazy (a BBC Three sitcom), renamed to Him & Her in 2010, and The Increasingly Poor Decisions of Todd Margaret (part of Comedy Showcase), a Channel 4 comedy with Spike Jonze and Will Arnett, written by David Cross and Shaun Pye.

He also appeared in three shorts: Drop (which premièred at the 2009 Rushes Soho Shorts Film Festival), Roar, Roar premiered at the Palm Springs Film Festival on 24 June 2009.

In 2011, he became the voice over/narrator for the BBC Three show Sun, Sex and Suspicious Parents and its spinoffs, which ran for five series up to July 2015. Tovey narrated every episode aired.

Tovey played Budgie, one of Gavin's friends, in the BBC comedy-drama Gavin & Stacey. In January 2012, he appeared in the British crime drama Sherlock, playing Henry Knight in the episode "The Hounds of Baskerville". He had a lead role in the ITV sitcom The Job Lot which aired in 2013 and is set in a busy unemployment bureau in the West Midlands.

In 2013, Tovey signed on to appear in the American television series Looking, about a group of gay friends living in San Francisco. Its 8-episode first season broadcast on HBO in 2014. Tovey was promoted to series regular for the second season.

In 2015, Tovey starred in Banished, a historical drama series written by Jimmy McGovern about a group of British convicts in Australia in the 18th century.

Also in 2015, Tovey made his first of many live appearances for arts and entertainment company Pin Drop Studio, reading a short story to an audience followed by an interview by Simon Oldfield.

In 2016, Tovey was cast in the ABC network thriller drama Quantico for the series regular role of Harry Doyle.

In April 2017, Tovey returned to the Royal National Theatre to appear in Marianne Elliot's revival of the Tony Kushner play Angels in America, opposite Andrew Garfield and Nathan Lane.

In September 2017, it was revealed that Tovey would be voicing Ray Terrill / The Ray, a reporter who gains light-based powers after being exposed to a genetic light bomb, in the animated web series Freedom Fighters: The Ray on CW Seed. Tovey appeared in "Crisis on Earth-X", the Arrowverse crossover event between Supergirl, Arrow, The Flash and Legends of Tomorrow.

In 2019, Tovey co-starred in an ensemble cast on the show Years and Years, and appeared with Helen Mirren and Ian McKellen in the drama film The Good Liar.

Tovey was awarded the Culture Award at the ninth annual Virgin Atlantic Attitude Awards.

In 2021, it was announced Tovey had been cast in Allelujah, a film adaptation of Alan Bennett's play of the same name.

In 2022, Tovey started a role as Patrick Read in American Horror Story: NYC.

Writing
Tovey is also an author, playwright and screenwriter. He has written three plays (all unperformed as of August 2010), and one of his short stories was published in women's magazine Company. He also wrote a short film, Victor, and as of August 2010 was seeking funding to produce the picture.

In 2021, he published, with his friend Robert Diament, the book Talk Art.

Art collecting
Tovey collects contemporary art, which he got into at the age of 21 when his parents bought him a Tracey Emin print that he admired called Dog Brains. Aside from several works by Emin, his collection now also includes works by Wolfgang Tillmans, Jamian Juliano Villani, Shannon Ebner, Rebecca Warren, Joyce Pensato, Amoako Boafo, Walter Price, Louis Fratino, Doron Langberg, Carmen Herrera, Rose Wylie, Toyin Ojih Odutola, Lisa Brice and Matias Faldbakken among others. Although he has been buying art since he was in his 20s, he considers himself to have been "properly collecting" since about 2010, with his collection now consisting of over 300 works of art. Tovey is passionate about supporting emerging and mid-career artists with his collecting.

Since 2018, Tovey has hosted a podcast called Talk Art with his friend, the gallerist Robert Diament of Carl Freedman gallery, in which the pair talk to their favourite artists, curators and art enthusiasts. In the over 120 episodes, guests have included Ryan Gander, Rose Wylie, Zawe Ashton and Hans Ulrich Obrist.

In 2019, Tovey guest curated Margate Now, an arts festival based in Margate. He has since curated a number of exhibitions for various galleries, as well as a contemporary art auction for Sotheby's.

Tovey was part of the jury of the 2021 Turner Prize.

Tovey was appointed the 2022 patron for the Art UK charity.

Personal life
Russell is openly gay. During his adolescent years, Tovey's family had difficulty accepting his sexual orientation. Although he says he came out to himself when he was 15 or 16, he came out to his parents when he was 18. Tovey and his father subsequently had a serious disagreement, with his father suggesting that, had he known earlier, he would have asked Tovey to take hormones or undergo some other medical treatment to "fix the problem". Tovey says his parents were deeply concerned about the possibility he might contract HIV, which might have contributed to the disagreement. The birth of Tovey's nephew Nathan in October 2004 helped them mend their relationship.

In 2015, Tovey was the subject of public criticism from the LGBT+ press regarding comments he made about effeminate gay men. In his interview with Tom Lamont of The Observer, the actor stated that his schooling made him feel as though he "had to toughen up", going on to say "If I'd have been able to relax, prance around and sing in the street, I might be a different person now." Much of the criticism centred on what was perceived to be a passive criticism of effeminate gay men, with Tovey saying that "I thank my dad for that, for not allowing me to go down the path." Tovey later apologised for the remarks and suggested they did not reflect his views.

Tovey was reported to be dating former porn star and rugby coach Steve Brockman beginning in early 2016. They became engaged in February 2018 but separated in June of the same year. They reconciled in 2019 and, as of 2023, are still together.

Filmography

Film

Television

Web

Other credits

Theatre

Radio and readings

Tovey has read several books for audio, notably a 2017 performance of The Picture of Dorian Gray. He is the narrator for the 20th anniversary edition audiobook of Nick Hornby's  High Fidelity, released in 2015. Also, since 2016, he is the reader for audiobooks of Liz Pichon's Tom Gates book series, starting from book 10, Super Good Skills (Almost...), taking over from Rupert Grint.

References

External links 

 Russell Tovey at the British Film Institute
 
 
 
 Interview with The New York Times

1981 births
Living people
20th-century English male actors
21st-century English male actors
20th-century English LGBT people
21st-century English LGBT people
English dramatists and playwrights
English male dramatists and playwrights
English male film actors
English male radio actors
English male Shakespearean actors
English male stage actors
English male television actors
English male voice actors
English gay actors
Male actors from Essex
People from Billericay
Writers from Essex